Super Sabre (Martin Fletcher) is a fictional character, a mutant appearing in American comic books published by Marvel Comics. His first appearance was in Uncanny X-Men #215.

Fictional character biography
Martin Fletcher was born in Massachusetts. During World War II, as Super Sabre he fought against the Axis powers which dominated Europe. He fought alongside three other heroes during this time: Stonewall, Crimson Commando, and Yankee Clipper. Following the war, Super Sabre along with the Commando and Stonewall continued to fight crime. They even hoped to join the Human Torch in fighting communists, but government officials were concerned that the over enthusiastic heroes would cause a real war. The government requested that the trio retire, which they reluctantly did. 

Fletcher, Crimson Commando, and Stonewall returned to America. When they arrived home they were disturbed by the criminal acts of people who thought they were "above the law". Finally deciding to do something, they came out of retirement and would kidnap criminals and hunt them for sport as vigilantes. Years later, while operating out of Adirondack State Park in New York state, they accidentally captured Storm and realized that she was not a criminal. Faced with this dilemma, they decided to hunt down Storm to keep their whereabouts a secret. Storm was also captured with another prisoner, drug dealer Priscilla Morrison, their actual target. Chasing down Morrison and Storm, Super Sabre was almost decapitated by a trap Storm had set, which buried him in an avalanche. Later, Morrison betrayed Storm, but before she could kill Storm, she was killed by the Crimson Commando. Storm and the Crimson Commando then fought in combat, which she won. After she won, she demanded that Commando and Stonewall turn themselves in. Distraught because they thought Super Sabre was dead, they complied and turned themselves in.

Months later Valerie Cooper arranged for the release of the Crimson Commando and Stonewall if they joined Freedom Force. They reluctantly agreed. Super Sabre publicly reappeared, alive, and also offered to join the Freedom Force. The trio was pardoned for their past crimes and became special operatives for the federal government of the United States.

Alongside Freedom Force, Super Sabre battled the X-Men in Dallas at first, but then battled cavemen transported to Dallas by time-waves created by the cosmic entity known as the Adversary. They witnessed the televised deaths of the X-Men, and Forge's return to Dallas. Freedom Force's attempts to enforce the government policy, the Mutant Registration Act, later led to a battle with the New Mutants in Dallas, and with Cyclops and Marvel Girl of X-Factor in which Marvel Girl defeated Super Sabre. They later attempted to apprehend Rusty Collins, but were thwarted by Skids. Following a mission to Muir Island which resulted in Stonewall's death at the hands of the Reavers. Later during a Freedom Force mission to capture Cable, who had escaped from federal custody, Super Sabre was almost decapitated again.

During an unknown period of time Super Sabre was seen alongside other speedsters such as Quicksilver, Whizzer, Speed Demon, Black Racer, Makkari, and the female Captain Marvel. The Runner pitted them against each other to find out who is the fastest being on Earth.

The Crimson Commando then led a Freedom Force mission to Kuwait City to rescue or kill physicist Reinhold Kurtzmann, which led to a fight with the Middle Eastern mercenary group, Desert Sword. Super Sabre was ultimately decapitated by the "cutting wind" of Aminedi, and the mission ended with Commando crippled. Following this disaster, Freedom Force was disbanded.

Years later, Wolverine visited the afterlife and was attacked by several of his dead foes, among them Stonewall, Pyro, and Super Sabre. Wolverine began to fight the dead villains until Colossus appeared to help Wolverine defeat them.

A young recruit of Mystique's later incarnation of the Brotherhood of Mutants took the code name Sabre, in honor of the late Super Sabre. This Sabre has somewhat similar mutant abilities as the original.

Super Sabre is resurrected by means of the Transmode Virus to serve as part of Selene's army of deceased mutants.  Under the control of Selene and Eli Bard, he takes part in the assault on the mutant nation of Utopia.

Powers and abilities
Super Sabre was a mutant able to run at tremendous speeds. Even at an advanced age, he was capable of approaching the speed of sound. He could move his hands at sonic speeds to produce a shockwave capable of knocking a person over and could create a "micro-sonic boom" by snapping his fingers at supersonic speeds. Super Sabre also had superhuman stamina and reflexes. He could create a wall of air pressure by moving his arms at superhuman speed and could run up walls and across water. Super Sabre's metabolism required air, food, and water; deprivation of any of these would diminish his speed and endurance. His physical abilities weakened with age but much less so than a normal human being of his advanced age.

Super Sabre wore a costume of synthetic stretch fabric treated to be highly resistant to damage from friction heat and other hazards of moving at superhuman speed.

References

External links
http://www.marvel.com/universe/Super_Sabre

Characters created by Chris Claremont
Marvel Comics characters who can move at superhuman speeds
Marvel Comics mutants
Marvel Comics supervillains